Aulacophora almora is a species of leaf beetle in the genus Aulacophora.

References

Beetles described in 1936
Aulacophora